Emile Lahoud Jr., more commonly Emile Emile Lahoud, (born 21 January 1975) is a Lebanese politician and businessman.

Early life
Emile Lahoud Jr. was born in Baabdat, Lebanon on 21 January 1975. He is the eldest son of former Lebanese President Emile Lahoud and Andree Amadoni.

Education
Emile Lahoud Jr. completed secondary education at International College in Beirut. He then enrolled at Notre Dame University (NDU). However, he transferred to the Lebanese American University (LAU) in 1993 where he obtained a Bachelor of Science degree in business marketing in 1997. Next, he began to study politics, international relations, economics, and social affairs at the graduate program of International Affairs at LAU. He received a master's degree there in 1999.

Career
Emile Lahoud Jr. founded L and R communications, a media company, in 1999. He was elected as the deputy of Metn in August 2000 in the general elections. He was part of the list headed by then minister of interior Michel Murr, and his election campaign was managed by Elias Murr. This caused the protests by rival candidates led by then Lebanon President Emile Lahoud's first cousin, Nassib Lahoud. In 2000, he attended a memorial service for the late President-elect Bashir Gemayel. His participation in the ceremony was reported to make upset Syrian authorities. Emile Lahoud Jr. did not take part in the 2005 general elections.

He extended his company, L and R communications, to Jordan, Saudi Arabia and Syria in 2006. It is argued that he monopolized the advertising market.

Personal life
Lahoud married Sabine Tanbourgi, daughter of Gilbert Tanbourgi in September 2002. He has two children, Emile and Emma. He is a swimmer and participated in 1988 and 1992 Summer Olympic Games.

References

1975 births
Children of national leaders
Lebanese corporate directors
Lebanese American University alumni
21st-century Lebanese businesspeople
Lebanese Maronites
Lebanese people of Armenian descent
Lebanese male swimmers
Living people
Members of the Parliament of Lebanon
Olympic swimmers of Lebanon
Swimmers at the 1988 Summer Olympics
Swimmers at the 1992 Summer Olympics
Swimmers at the 1990 Asian Games
Asian Games competitors for Lebanon
Lahoud family